McGlothin is a surname. It is a shortened form of McGlothlin used in America. Notable people with the surname include:

Pat McGlothin (1920–2014), American baseball player

Americanized surnames